George Fletcher (circa 1666 – circa March 1708) was the eldest son of Sir George Fletcher, 2nd Baronet by his second wife Mary, daughter of James Johnstone, 1st Earl of Hartfell. From a local Whig family, he represented the borough of Cockermouth in the Parliament of England from 1698 to 1701 and the county of Cumberland from 1701 to 1702 and then from 1705 to his death. He died without issue, so the baronetcy became extinct on the death of his elder half-brother Sir Henry Fletcher, 3rd Bt.

References 

1660s births
1708 deaths
British MPs 1707–1708
Members of the Parliament of Great Britain for English constituencies
Cumbria MPs
Younger sons of baronets
English MPs 1698–1700
English MPs 1701
English MPs 1701–1702
English MPs 1705–1707